The 45th Guillermo Mendoza Memorial Scholarship Foundation Box Office Entertainment Awards (GMMSF-BOEA) is a part of the annual awards in the Philippines held on May 18, 2014. The award-giving body honors Filipino actors, actresses and other performers' commercial success, regardless of artistic merit, in the Philippine entertainment industry.

Winners selection
On April 25, the Guillermo Mendoza Memorial Scholarship Foundation board of jurors met in the Basement Function Room of Barrio Fiesta in EDSA Greenhills. They deliberated for this year's winners and it took them four hours to reach their final decision.

The winners were chosen from the Top 10 Philippine films of 2013, top-rating shows in Philippine television, top recording awards received by singers, and top gross receipts of concerts and performances.

Award ceremony
On May 18, 2014, at Solaire Resort & Casino in Parañaque, Philippines, the Box Office Entertainment Awards night was held.

Awards

Major awards
Phenomenal Stars - Vic Sotto and Vice Ganda (My Little Bossings and Girl, Boy, Bakla, Tomboy)
 Box Office King – John Lloyd Cruz (It Takes a Man and a Woman)
 Box Office Queen – Sarah Geronimo (It Takes a Man and a Woman)
 Male Concert Performer of the Year – Vice Ganda
 Female Concert Performer of the Year – Sarah Geronimo
 Male Recording Artist of the Year – Christian Bautista
 Female Recording Artist of the Year – Sarah Geronimo

Film category
 Phenomenal Child Stars – Ryzza Mae Dizon and James "Bimby" Aquino-Yap (My Little Bossings)
 Film Actor of The Year – Robin Padilla (10,000 Hours)
 Film Actress of the Year – Maricel Soriano (Girl, Boy, Bakla, Tomboy)
 Prince of Philippine Movies – Daniel Padilla (Pagpag: Siyam na Buhay)
 Princess of Philippine Movies – Kathryn Bernardo (Pagpag: Siyam na Buhay)
 Most Promising Male Star of the Year – Enrique Gil
 Most Promising Female Star of the Year – Janella Salvador
 Most Popular Film Producer – Star Cinema
 Most Popular Screenwriter – Carmi Raymundo (It Takes a Man and a Woman)
 Most Popular Film Directors – Marlon Rivera (My Little Bossings) and Wenn Deramas (Girl, Boy, Bakla, Tomboy)

Music category
 Promising Male Singer/Performer – Daniel Padilla
 Promising Female Singer/Performer – Bea Binene
 Most Popular Recording/Performing Group – Calla Lily
 Most Promising Recording/Performing Group – 1:43 ("Sa Isang Sulyap Mo")
 Most Popular Novelty Singer – Toni Gonzaga ("Kahit Na")

Television category
 Top Rating Primetime Drama – Juan dela Cruz (ABS-CBN)
 Top Rating Daytime Drama – Be Careful With My Heart (ABS-CBN)
 Top Rating News and Public Affairs – Kapuso Mo, Jessica Soho (GMA-7)
 Top Reality Talk/Talent Search/Game Show – The Voice Philippines (ABS-CBN)
 Top Rating Noontime Musical/Variety Program – Eat Bulaga! (GMA-7)
 Most Popular Loveteam on Television – Richard Yap and Jodi Sta. Maria (ABS-CBN)
 Most Promising Loveteam on Television – Janella Salvador and Jerome Ponce (ABS-CBN)
 Most Popular Male Child Performer – Raikko Mateo (Honesto - ABS-CBN)
 Most Popular Female Child Performer – Mutya Orquia (Be Careful With My Heart - ABS-CBN)

Special Awards
 Bert Marcelo Lifetime Achievement Award – Pokwang
 Government Service Award – Manila Mayor Joseph Estrada

Multiple awards

Individuals with multiple awards 
The following individual names received two or more awards:

Companies with multiple awards 
The following companies received one or multiple awards in the television category:

References

Box Office Entertainment Awards
2014 film awards
2014 television awards
2014 music awards